St. Columba's Church is a historic Roman Catholic parish church located within the Archdiocese of Newark at Pennsylvania Avenue and Brunswick Street in Newark, Essex County, New Jersey, United States.

History
It was built in the 1871, rebuilt in 1898 and added to the National Register of Historic Places in 1972.

See also 
 National Register of Historic Places listings in Essex County, New Jersey

References

Roman Catholic churches completed in 1898
19th-century Roman Catholic church buildings in the United States
Roman Catholic churches in Newark, New Jersey
Churches on the National Register of Historic Places in New Jersey
Roman Catholic churches in New Jersey
National Register of Historic Places in Newark, New Jersey
1898 establishments in New Jersey
New Jersey Register of Historic Places